Sphenomorphus annectens is a species of lizard in the genus Sphenomorphus of the family  Scincidae, described by George Albert Boulenger in 1897. According to Catalogue of Life Sphenomorphus annectens does not have known subspecies.

References

annectens
Reptiles described in 1897
Skinks of New Guinea